Kapten I Wayan Dipta Stadium, is a multi-purpose stadium in Gianyar Regency, Bali, Indonesia, and the home of Indonesia Liga 1 club Bali United. It has a capacity of 18,000 spectators.

History 
In 2014, Bali United plays their home matches at Kapten I Wayan Dipta Stadium after moving their homebase from Samarinda to Bali. IDR 5 billion was spent to renovate the stadium by adding new lighting system, upgrading the dressing rooms, repainting some parts of the stadium, repairing the toilets as well as upgrading other facilities.

Services and facilities

Bali United Store
Bali United Store is an official merchandise store of Bali United. The store opened to the public on 19 March 2016 and it is located at the bottom of the southern tribune of the stadium, precisely next to gate 5.

Merchandise store that has been operating for approximately a year, is renovated by expanding the area store. On 9 June 2017, Vice Regent of Gianyar Made Mahayastra inaugurated Bali United merchandise store after being renovated. There is something that can be considered fresh after the renovation, which is the stage for the show meet and great the supporters with the players of Bali United.

LED Perimeter Board
Management of Bali United made a new breakthrough related to the appearance of Kapten I Wayan Dipta Stadium by installing LED perimeter board. CEO of Bali United, Yabes Tanuri said, the installation of LED perimeter board is intended to make the stadium view more interesting. In addition, he also mentioned that the installation of LED perimeter board aims to give local businessmen the opportunity to promote their business in Bali United.

The installation process of LED perimeter board was conducted on 12 October 2017 and started operation on 20 October 2017 during a home game against PS TNI.

Bali United Cafe
Bali United Cafe, was unveiled on 5 June 2018 by performing a melaspas ceremony (ceremony for new building in Bali). The cafe itself is located in the southwestern part of Kapten I Wayan Dipta Stadium or more precisely under the southern wing tribune. The visitors will be able to watch the Bali United match from inside Bali United Cafe. Bali United Cafe will operate daily from 11.00 to 23.00 Indonesia Central Standard Time. There is also a mini store located in the area of Bali United Cafe.

Bali United Playland
The management of Bali United also unveiled Bali United Playland together with the inauguration of Bali United Cafe. Bali United Playland is a play area for children that is comfortable and fun. Management wants to give comfort to the supporters who come to the stadium to bring the children.

Expansions
Bali United did some renovations for Asian competition in 2018. Renovations included repairing and increasing the number of toilets as well as improving the lighting quality of the stadium lights. The current floodlights are 1,200 lux according to the standard of AFC.

In addition, management planned to increase the capacity of the stadium: 600 places for south wing tribune and 600 for south tribune. So there is a total addition of 1,200, bringing the total capacity to 26,200. Additional grandstand construction had been started since 3 November 2017 for the laying of the first stone. The process of adding the capacity of the tribune took approximately two and a half months and was to be completed early 2018. After adding seats to the East-Tribune the capacity is now 22,931.

After the stadium was chosen to be a venue for the 2021 FIFA U-20 World Cup, renovations work are expected to be done to the stadium. In early 2020, more seats are added to the stands as an effort to make the stadium an all-seater stadium that is suitable for the tournament.

International matches hosted

References

External links 
 Stadium information
 Kapten I Wayan Dipta Stadium at Google Maps

Stadium
Football venues in Indonesia
Football venues in Bali
Multi-purpose stadiums in Indonesia
Buildings and structures in Bali
Sports venues completed in 2003
Gianyar Regency